João Pedro Gomes Santos (born June 15, 1979 in Lisbon) is a Portuguese basketball player, currently playing for Portuguese side FC Porto. He measures 2.03 metres and plays as a power forward.
He played in Eurobasket 2007 by the Portugal national team and averanged 11.2 ppg, 4.7 rpg and 0.8 apg.

ACB career statistics 

|-
| align="left" | 2007–08
| align="left" | Grupo Capitol Valladolid
| 34 || 22 || 16.7 || .415 || .386 || .843 || 1.6 || .3 || .6 || .2 || 5.3
|-
| align="left" | 2006–07
| align="left" | Grupo Capitol Valladolid
| 33 || 13 || 17.6 || .387 || .345 || .850 || 2.6 || .4 || .4 || .2 || 6.3
|-
| align="left" | 2005–06
| align="left" | Forum Valladolid
| 34 || 10 || 17.0 || .405 || .396 || .862 || 2.4 || .4 || .5 || .1 || 5.8
|-
| align="left" | 2004–05
| align="left" | Forum Valladolid
| 27 || 1 || 7.4 || .449 || .406 || .667 || 0.7 || .1 || .07 || .1 || 2.3
|-
| align="left" | Career
| align="left" | 
| 128 || 46 || 15.1 || .406 || .377 || .836 || 1.9 || .3 || .4 || .1 || 5.1

External links
 EuroBasket 2007 Profile
João Santos Player Info at ACB.com 

1979 births
Living people
CB Valladolid players
Liga ACB players
Nevada Wolf Pack men's basketball players
Portuguese expatriate basketball people in the United States
Portuguese men's basketball players
Power forwards (basketball)
FC Porto basketball players
S.L. Benfica basketball players
Small forwards
Sportspeople from Lisbon